Noncommutative geometry (NCG) is a branch of mathematics concerned with a geometric approach to noncommutative algebras, and with the construction of spaces that are locally presented by noncommutative algebras of functions (possibly in some generalized sense). A noncommutative algebra is an associative algebra in which the multiplication is not commutative, that is, for which  does not always equal ; or more generally an algebraic structure in which one of the principal binary operations is not commutative; one also allows additional structures, e.g. topology or norm, to be possibly carried by the noncommutative algebra of functions.

An approach giving deep insight about noncommutative spaces is through operator algebras (i.e. algebras of bounded linear operators on a Hilbert space). Perhaps one of the typical examples of a noncommutative space is the "noncommutative tori", which played a key role in the early development of this field in 1980s and lead to noncommutative versions of vector bundles, connections, curvature, etc.

Motivation

The main motivation is to extend the commutative duality between spaces and functions to the noncommutative setting. In mathematics, spaces, which are geometric in nature, can be related to numerical functions on them. In general, such functions will form a commutative ring. For instance, one may take the ring C(X) of continuous complex-valued functions on a topological space X. In many cases (e.g., if X is a compact Hausdorff space), we can recover X from C(X), and therefore it makes some sense to say that X has commutative topology.

More specifically, in topology, compact Hausdorff topological spaces can be reconstructed from the Banach algebra of functions on the space (Gelfand–Naimark). In commutative algebraic geometry, algebraic schemes are locally prime spectra of commutative unital rings (A. Grothendieck), and every quasi-separated scheme  can be reconstructed up to isomorphism of schemes from the category of quasicoherent sheaves of -modules (P. Gabriel–A. Rosenberg). For Grothendieck topologies, the cohomological properties of a site are invariants of the corresponding category of sheaves of sets viewed abstractly as a topos (A. Grothendieck). In all these cases, a space is reconstructed from the algebra of functions or its categorified version—some category of sheaves on that space.

Functions on a topological space can be multiplied and added pointwise hence they form a commutative algebra; in fact these operations are local in the topology of the base space, hence the functions form a sheaf of commutative rings over the base space.

The dream of noncommutative geometry is to generalize this duality to the duality between noncommutative algebras, or sheaves of noncommutative algebras, or sheaf-like noncommutative algebraic or operator-algebraic structures, and geometric entities of certain kinds, and give an interaction between the algebraic and geometric description of those via this duality.

Regarding that the commutative rings correspond to usual affine schemes, and commutative C*-algebras to usual topological spaces, the extension to noncommutative rings and algebras requires non-trivial generalization of topological spaces as "non-commutative spaces". For this reason there is some talk about non-commutative topology, though the term also has other meanings.

Applications in mathematical physics

Some applications in particle physics are described in the entries Noncommutative standard model and Noncommutative quantum field theory. The sudden rise in interest in noncommutative geometry in physics follows after the speculations of its role in M-theory made in 1997.

Motivation from ergodic theory
Some of the theory developed by Alain Connes to handle noncommutative geometry at a technical level has roots in older attempts, in particular in ergodic theory. The proposal of George Mackey to create a virtual subgroup theory, with respect to which ergodic group actions would become homogeneous spaces of an extended kind, has by now been subsumed.

Noncommutative C*-algebras, von Neumann algebras
The (formal) duals of non-commutative C*-algebras are often now called non-commutative spaces. This is by analogy with the Gelfand representation, which shows that commutative C*-algebras are dual to locally compact Hausdorff spaces.  In general, one can associate to any C*-algebra S a topological space Ŝ; see spectrum of a C*-algebra.

For the duality between σ-finite measure spaces and commutative von Neumann algebras, noncommutative von Neumann algebras are called non-commutative measure spaces.

Noncommutative differentiable manifolds

A smooth Riemannian manifold M is a topological space with a lot of extra structure. From its algebra of continuous functions C(M) we only recover M topologically. The algebraic invariant that recovers the Riemannian structure is a spectral triple. It is constructed from a smooth vector bundle E over M, e.g. the exterior algebra bundle. The Hilbert space L2(M, E) of square integrable sections of E carries a representation of C(M) by multiplication operators, and we consider an unbounded operator D in L2(M, E) with compact resolvent (e.g. the signature operator), such that the commutators [D, f] are bounded whenever f is smooth. A deep theorem states that M as a Riemannian manifold can be recovered from this data.

This suggests that one might define a noncommutative Riemannian manifold as a spectral triple (A, H, D), consisting of a representation of a C*-algebra A on a Hilbert space H, together with an unbounded operator D on H, with compact resolvent, such that [D, a] is bounded for all a in some dense subalgebra of A. Research in spectral triples is very active, and many examples of noncommutative manifolds have been constructed.

Noncommutative affine and projective schemes
In analogy to the duality between affine schemes and commutative rings, we define a category of noncommutative affine schemes as the dual of the category of associative unital rings. There are certain analogues of Zariski topology in that context so that one can glue such affine schemes to more general objects.

There are also generalizations of the Cone and of the Proj of a commutative graded ring, mimicking a theorem of Serre on Proj. Namely the category of quasicoherent sheaves of O-modules on a Proj of a commutative graded algebra is equivalent to the category of graded modules over the ring localized on Serre's subcategory of graded modules of finite length; there is also analogous theorem for coherent sheaves when the algebra is Noetherian. This theorem is extended as a definition of noncommutative projective geometry by Michael Artin and J. J. Zhang, who add also some general ring-theoretic conditions (e.g. Artin–Schelter regularity).

Many properties of projective schemes extend to this context. For example, there exists an analog of the celebrated Serre duality for noncommutative projective schemes of Artin and Zhang.

A. L. Rosenberg has created a rather general relative concept of noncommutative quasicompact scheme (over a base category), abstracting Grothendieck's study of morphisms of schemes and covers in terms of categories of quasicoherent sheaves and flat localization functors. There is also another interesting approach via localization theory, due to Fred Van Oystaeyen, Luc Willaert and Alain Verschoren, where the main concept is that of a schematic algebra.

Invariants for noncommutative spaces

Some of the motivating questions of the theory are concerned with extending known topological invariants to formal duals of noncommutative (operator) algebras and other replacements and candidates for noncommutative spaces. One of the main starting points of Alain Connes' direction in noncommutative geometry is his discovery of a new homology theory associated to noncommutative associative algebras and noncommutative operator algebras, namely the cyclic homology and its relations to the algebraic K-theory (primarily via Connes–Chern character map).

The theory of characteristic classes of smooth manifolds has been extended to spectral triples, employing the tools of operator K-theory and cyclic cohomology. Several generalizations of now-classical index theorems allow for effective extraction of numerical invariants from spectral triples. The fundamental characteristic class in cyclic cohomology, the JLO cocycle, generalizes the classical Chern character.

Examples of noncommutative spaces
 In the phase space formulation of quantum mechanics,  the symplectic phase space of classical mechanics is deformed into a non-commutative phase space generated by the position and momentum operators.
 The noncommutative standard model is a proposed extension of the standard model of particle physics.
 The noncommutative torus, deformation of the function algebra of the ordinary torus, can be given the structure of a spectral triple. This class of examples has been studied intensively and still functions as a test case for more complicated situations.
 Snyder space
 Noncommutative algebras arising from foliations.
 Examples related to dynamical systems arising from number theory, such as the Gauss shift on continued fractions, give rise to noncommutative algebras that appear to have interesting noncommutative geometries.

See also
Commutativity
Phase space formulation
Moyal product
Fuzzy sphere
Noncommutative algebraic geometry
Noncommutative topology

Citations

References

Further reading

External links

Introduction to Quantum Geometry by Micho Đurđevich

 (An easier introduction that is still rather technical)
Noncommutative geometry on arxiv.org
 MathOverflow, Theories of Noncommutative Geometry

 Noncommutative geometry and particle physics

 
Mathematical quantization
Quantum gravity